Angelo Diego Keithley Castro III, simply known as Diego Castro III (born November 30, 1975), is a Filipino actor and broadcaster. He has appeared in over forty movies and dozens of television shows, and was a part of the youth-oriented shows, Gimik and T.G.I.S. He is currently the news anchor for One News Now on One News.

Biography
Angelo Diego Castro III is the son of veteran broadcast journalists, June Keithley and the late Angelo Castro Jr.

He started his career in front the camera as an actor in a series of soap operas and TV commercials. He started acting in theater at the age of 11, appearing in plays by Fr. James B. Reuter productions.

Away from the glare of the spotlight, he is an accomplished chef. He graduated from Culinary Arts Management back in 2004 and was Executive Chef for two major food brands in the Philippines. He currently owns a restaurant called Lord of the Wings.

His journalistic genes and love for the dishes paved the way for him being a resident host and cook in UNTV’s morning program Good Morning Kuya.

He has appeared in several TV series in the Philippines, including Esperanza (1997), Growing Up (1997) and Gulong ng Palad (2006) to name a few in ABS-CBN and GMA Network. Kasalanan Bang Ibigin Ka? is considered as Castro's biggest break.

Filmography

Television
 One News Now (2023-present)
 One Balita Pilipinas (2022–2023)
 Maynila: Party Pa More (2016) as Armand
 Magpakailanman: Boses ng Puso (2015) as John
 Why News (2015–2022)
 Strawberry Lane (2014) as Mario Escudero
 The Borrowed Wife (2014) as Carlo
 Kasalanan Bang Ibigin Ka? (2012) as Vitto
 Maalaala Mo Kaya: Cellphone (2008) as Chase
 Good Morning Kuya (2007–2022)
 Rounin (2007) as Tristan
 Sa Piling Mo (2006) as Marco Jimenez
 Gulong ng Palad (2006) as Terrence Morales
 Spirits (2004) as Harvey
 30 Days (2004)
 Basta't Kasama Kita (2003) as Borgy
 Sa Dulo Ng Walang Hanggan (2001) as Larry Medrano
 Pangako Sa' Yo (2000) as Lloyd Sandoval
 Esperanza (1997) as Bernard Castello
 Gimik (1996) as Jigs Mercado

Personal life
Before he married his co-anchor Angela Lagunzad, Castro was previously married to former actress Raven Villanueva, whom he had a child, Angelica Claire, who later became an actress in GMA Network. Castro also has a daughter named Raffa from another ex-wife, Czarina Polman, a former actress by the name Rina Rosal.

References

External links
 

1975 births
Filipino male television actors
Filipino television news anchors
Living people
People from Quezon City
Male actors from Metro Manila